Margate Lifeboat Station is a Royal National Lifeboat Institution (RNLI) station located in Margate in the English county of Kent. The station is over 160 years old. Its crews have earned a number of gallantry awards, including five silver and 1 bronze RNLI medals for bravery.

History

Original location 
The first lifeboat station in Margate was served by a lifeboat called Angela and Hannah which had been given to the town in 1857 by Baroness Angela Burdett-Coutts. In 1860, the RNLI took responsibility for the lifeboat and its station.  

On 3 January 1861 the Margate committee proposed a design for a new boathouse to be located on land leased from the South Eastern and Chatham Railway company. The RNLI inspector instead suggested that the existing boathouse be refitted to suit the RNLI's needs. The reworked boathouse was opened on 31 August that year. 

The new lifeboat and launch carriage was delivered on 4 August 1866, and was launched from the new station on 7 August where a public demonstration took place. The new lifeboat was called Quiver No.1 after The Quiver magazine, a periodical of the time which had provided donations toward the cost of a new boat. In the following year it became apparent that the launch system and location of the station on the stone pier had a few shortfalls. Among them was that on several occasions the horses used to launch the boat had refused to face the water thus causing delayed launches.

Move to Margate Jetty 
On 9 December 1896, it was suggested that the lifeboat should be moved to Margate Jetty, where two slipways would be built to provide an operating capacity of two lifeboats, at an estimated cost of £3,045. A storm damaged the slipways during construction, revealing shortfalls in the design which necessitated revisions to the height of the slipway decks. Subsequent disagreements between the RNLI, the local lifeboat committee and the Margate Pier and Harbour Company further delayed the completion. The slipways, designated Stations 1 and 2, were declared open by politician James Lowther on 14 May 1898. That same day, two new lifeboats were handed over to the station and were christened Civil Service No.1 (ON 415)  and Eliza Harriet (ON 411).

By 21 March 1925, construction of a new boathouse and slipway to accommodate a new Watson-class motor lifeboat was completed. The boathouse was 61 ft long and 22 feet wide and was fitted with a petrol-driven winch and dynamo to provide lighting. The new lifeboat, the Lord Southborough (ON 688), arrived from London where she had been on exhibition at the British Empire Exhibition at Wembley. Prior to her arrival at Margate, she was involved in a collision at Gravesend with a shrimping boat which ultimately sank. This episode turned out to be the first service the new lifeboat performed when she rescued the boat's two crewmen.

In 1927 the No. 1 Station was closed and the Eliza Harriet was retired after 30 years service. The demolition of the western slipway completed across several months in 1928.

World War II 
The Second World War saw the station fall under the control of the Royal Navy, although day-to-day running was still carried out by the branch personnel. Coxswain Edward Parker was awarded a Distinguished Service Medal for his work in taking the Lord Southborough to the beaches during the Dunkirk evacuation. Following Dunkirk, the Margate Station found itself one of the busiest lifeboat stations during the Battle of Britain, along with the nearby Ramsgate station.

1950s–1970s 
The Lord Southborough was retired from the station in 1951. On 17 May 1951 the station took delivery of a new all-weather lifeboat called North Foreland (Civil Service No. 11) (ON 888), a 46 ft 9in Watson-class motor lifeboat. The boathouse sustained damage following a severe storm in 1953, requiring the complete replacement of the floor.

On 20 May 1960 the Margate Station celebrated its centenary under the control of the RNLI. Records show that during that period, the station's crew had rescued more than 1,800 people. In 1966 the station began to operate an inshore inflatable lifeboat D class with the designation D-99. The boathouse significantly damaged following a severe two-day storm which hit the North Kent coast on 16–17 October 1967.

In September 1974, the Margate Pier and Harbour Company closed the iron Margate Jetty to the public as it had become unsafe, but provision was made for the crew to carry on using the jetty for the lifeboat station. After several years of debate, it was decided in 1977 that a new station would be built on shore, and a new carriage-launched Rother-class lifeboat would be supplied.

1978 North Sea storm surge 

On 11 January 1978 a violent storm with gale-force winds and waves hit the North Kent coast. This washed away most of the iron jetty, leaving just the boathouse and slipway with no access to the severely damaged lifeboat house from the shore. Members of the crew were airlifted to the boathouse by Royal Air Force helicopter to launch the North Foreland, which was stranded inside. The North Foreland was taken into Margate Harbour where she remained until she was transferred to Ramsgate where she operated until the new lifeboat was ready to take over at Margate. The inshore station had also sustained damage and that was temporarily housed at Margate Police Station.

Since 1978

Work began on the present lifeboat station in March 1978 and was completed by August 1978. The new  lifeboat Silver Jubilee (ON 1046) was handed over in November 1978. In the mid-1980s the Margate Station Committee split into two organizations; the Margate RNLI Fundraising Branch and the Margate Lifeboat Operational Committee, which handles day-to-day operations. In 1991 the Silver Jubilee was replaced by the  lifeboat Leonard Kent (ON 1177). In 1996 the boathouse was enlarged and upgraded.

In May 1999 a new D class lifeboat, Tigger Too (D545), was placed in service. It was replaced by the D class Tigger Three (D-706) in December 2008. 

Following the failure to obtain planning permission and the End of Life of the Mersey Class lifeboats Leonard Kent (ON 1177) was withdrawn in May 2021 and replaced by a B-Class inshore lifeboat. ALB cover being provided by flank stations.

Fleet

No. 1 Station Lifeboats

No. 2 Station Lifeboats

Inshore lifeboats

Auxiliary vehicles 
 Talus MB-H amphibious launch tractor (T-109)

References

History of Kent
Lifeboat stations in Kent
Margate